Fernwald is a municipality in the German state of Hesse, located 40 miles (64 kilometers) north of Frankfurt am Main and 4.4 miles (7 kilometers) east of Gießen. Fernwald is part of the district of Gießen.

History

Fernwald was created in 1971 by integrating the former independent communities of Steinbach, Annerod, and Albach.

Regional Businesses

ADF Allgemeine Datenbank für Forderungseinzug GmbH
AfU - Agentur für Unternehmensnachrichten GmbH
Rovema Verpackungsmaschinen GmbH

References

Giessen (district)